Ludington is the largest city and county seat of Mason County in the U.S. state of Michigan. As of the 2010 census, the city population was 8,076.

A harbor town on Lake Michigan, Ludington is at the mouth of the Pere Marquette River. Many people come to Ludington year round for recreation, including boating and swimming on Lake Michigan, Hamlin Lake, and other smaller inland lakes, as well as hunting, fishing, and camping. Nearby are Ludington State Park (which includes the Big Sable Point Light), Nordhouse Dunes Wilderness, and Manistee National Forest. Ludington is also the home port of the SS Badger, a vehicle and passenger ferry with daily service in the summer across Lake Michigan to Manitowoc, Wisconsin. Watching the Badger come into port in the evening from the end of the north breakwall by the Ludington lighthouse is a favorite local pastime.

Ludington has multiple golf and disc golf courses. In summer, the city hosts one of the largest Gus Macker basketball tournaments (with 35,500 spectators), the Ludington Area Jaycees Freedom Festival (July 4), the Lakestride Half Marathon in June, and the West Shore Art League's Art Fair. In 2005, as ranked by AAA, Ludington was the fifth-most-popular tourist city in Michigan, behind Mackinaw City, Traverse City, Muskegon, and Sault Ste. Marie.

History

In 1675, Father Jacques Marquette, French missionary and explorer, died and was laid to rest near the modern site of Ludington. A memorial and 40-foot iron cross were built in 1955 to mark the location.

In 1845, Burr Caswell moved to the area near the mouth of the Pere Marquette River as a location for trapping and fishing. In July 1847, when he brought his family to live there, they became the first permanent residents of European ancestry. Two years later they built a two-story wood-framed house on their farm. After the organization of Mason County in 1855, the first floor of this building was converted into the county's first courthouse. Restored in 1976 by the Mason County Historical Society, the structure stands today as a part of White Pine Village, a museum consisting of several restored and replica Mason County buildings (see external links).

The town was originally named Pere Marquette, then later named after the industrialist James Ludington, whose logging operations the village developed around. Ludington was incorporated as a City in 1873, the same year that the County seat was moved from the Village of Lincoln to the City of Ludington. The area boom in the late 19th century was due to these sawmills and also the discovery of salt deposits.

By 1892, 162 million board feet of lumber and 52 million wood shingles had been produced by the Ludington sawmills. With all of this commerce occurring, Ludington became a major Great Lakes shipping port.

In 1875, the Flint and Pere Marquette Railroad (F&PM) began cross-lake shipping operations with the sidewheel steamer SS John Sherman. It became apparent quite early that the John Sherman was not large enough to handle the volume of freight and the F&PM Railroad contracted with the Goodrich Line of Steamers to handle the break bulk freight out of the Port of Ludington.

In 1897, the F&PM railroad constructed the first steel car ferry, the Pere Marquette. This was the beginning of the creation of a fleet of ferries to continue the rail cargo across Lake Michigan to Manitowoc, Wisconsin. The fleet was also expanded to carry cars and passengers across the lake. By the mid-1950s, Ludington had become the largest car ferry port in the world. Unfortunately, due to disuse and declining industry, this fleet eventually dwindled. Currently only one carferry, the SS Badger, makes regular trips across the lake from Ludington, one of only two lake-crossing car ferries on Lake Michigan.

During the late 1910s and early 1920s, Ludington was the home of the Ludington Mariners minor league baseball team. A team of the same name currently plays "old time base ball" in historical reenactments of the original version of the game.

Geography

The Ludington North Breakwall Light is at the end of the north pierhead on Lake Michigan. Ludington is part of Northern Michigan.

Climate
Ludington has a humid continental climate (Köppen Dfb) bordering on the hot-summer subtype Dfa seen further south in Michigan. Winters are cold and snowy, and summers too are moderated by Lake Michigan, with the record below .

Transportation
All four highways in Mason County go through, or near Ludington.
 enters the city from the east, connecting with Clare, Midland and Bay City. It continues across Lake Michigan into Wisconsin via the SS Badger, providing carferry service to Manitowoc.
 is a freeway to the south of a junction with US 10 east of Ludington.
 is a section of the former US 31 along Pere Marquette Highway east of the city.
 is a spur route providing access to Ludington State Park, to the north of the city, from US 10 downtown.
 both run through Ludington; USBR 20 ends at the SS Badger.

Demographics

2010 census
As of the 2010 census, there were 8,076 people, 3,549 households, and 2,004 families residing in the city. The racial makeup of the city was 92.2% White, 1.1% African American, 1.4% Native American, 0.6% Asian, 2.0% from other races, and 2.6% from two or more races. Hispanic or Latino of any race were 6.3% of the population.

There were 3,549 households, of which 26.7% had children under the age of 18 living with them, 38.8% were married couples living together, 13.7% had a female householder with no husband present, 3.9% had a male householder with no wife present, and 43.5% were non-families. 37.8% of all households were made up of individuals, and 17.7% had someone living alone who was 65 years of age or older. The average household size was 2.19 and the average family size was 2.87.

The median age in the city was 43 years. 21.8% of residents were under the age of 18; 8.7% were between the ages of 18 and 24; 21.7% were from 25 to 44; 26.7% were from 45 to 64; and 21.1% were 65 years of age or older. The gender makeup of the city was 45.8% male and 54.2% female.

2000 census
As of the 2000 census, there were 8,357 people, 3,690 households, and 2,166 families residing in the city. The racial makeup of the city was 95.0% White, 1.0% African American, 0.9% Native American, 0.2% Asian, 1.1% from other races, and 1.8% from two or more races. Hispanic or Latino of any race were 4.2% of the population.

There were 3,690 households, out of which 28.0% had children under the age of 18 living with them, 42.2% were married couples living together, 13.3% had a female householder with no husband present, and 41.3% were non-families. 36.3% of all households were made up of individuals, and 17.3% had someone living alone who was 65 years of age or older. The average household size was 2.21 and the average family size was 2.88.

In the city, the population was spread out, with 24.0% under the age of 18, 8.5% from 18 to 24, 26.0% from 25 to 44, 21.7% from 45 to 64, and 19.8% who were 65 years of age or older. The median age was 39 years. For every 100 females, there were 84.9 males. For every 100 females age 18 and over, there were 80.3 males.

The median income for a household in the city was $28,089, and the median income for a family was $36,333. Males had a median income of $31,970 versus $22,809 for females. The per capita income for the city was $17,215. About 12.9% of families and 16.3% of the population were below the poverty line, including 27.7% of those under age 18 and 8.0% of those age 65 or over.

Industry
Just south of Ludington is the Ludington Pumped Storage Power Plant, which generates pumped storage hydroelectricity. In town, there are Whitehall Industries, a division of the UACJ group (aluminum extrusion and aluminum fabrication), Occidental Petroleum Corporation (manufacturer of calcium chloride products), Great Lakes Castings Corporation, Amptech, Inc., and Carrom Company. The Fitch Four Drive Tractor Company  was founded in Ludington. FloraCraft, Great Lakes Castings, and Brill are also three big factories there. Whitehall Industries has three manufacturing facilities in Ludington.

Media
Ludington is home to four radio stations and one newspaper. The original radio station was WKLA, which continues today with a talk radio format at 1450 AM. In the 1970s, WKLA-FM (Adult Contemporary) and WKZC-FM (Country, licensed to nearby Scottville) were added. In 1999, WMOM-FM (Top 40, licensed to Pentwater) signed on the air. The Ludington Daily News has been serving the Ludington area from its location on N. Rath Avenue since the 1880s. The Daily News website records over 4,000 visitors each day.

Education
Students in Ludington attend Ludington Area Schools. Students attend Ludington Elementary School (grades PreK-5), O.J. DeJonge Middle School (grades 6-8), and Ludington High School (grades 9-12). Ludington's teams are known as the "Orioles".

Notable people
 Merrie Amsterburg – musician
 Burr Caswell – early settler and developer of Ludington area and Mason County
 Charles F. Conrad – founder of the Lake Michigan Carferry Service
 Antoine Ephrem Cartier – early settler and developer of Ludington
 Warren Antoine Cartier – early settler and developer of Ludington
 Mike Hankwitz – college football coach
 Henry L. Haskell – inventor of Haskelite and the carroms game.  
 Ike Kelley – National Football League player
 Jacques Marquette – 17th century French missionary who on his way to St. Ignace was brought ashore near the present site of Ludington, where he later died. A shrine in Ludington, in the form of a cross, marks the place where Father Marquette died.
 William L. Mercereau – superintendent of steamships for the Pere Marquette Railway.
 William Rath, lumber baron and mayor.
 Justus Smith Stearns – businessman and politician

Notable events 
 The Port of Ludington Maritime Museum was opened June 10, 2017. It is housed in the former U.S. Coast Guard Station, now on the National Register of Historic Places.

Guinness world records 

 Guinness world record of ice cream dessert over a half mile long on June 11, 2016 - see House of Flavors record
 Guinness world record of 1,387 sand angels at Stearns Park Beach on June 10, 2017.

Landmarks
Warren A. and Catherine Cartier House, NRHP designated mansion

Gallery

See also

Carrom Company
Epworth Heights
Haskelite
Haskell Manufacturing Company
Henry Ludington
Justus Smith Stearns
Ludington Public Library
Ludington State Park
Mason County District Library
Rasmus Rasmussen (merchant)
SS Pere Marquette
Star Watch Case Company

References

External links
City of Ludington
Ludington Daily News
Ludington Area Convention and Visitors Bureau
The Official Ludington and Scottville Chamber of Commerce and Convention and Visitors Bureau

Cities in Mason County, Michigan
County seats in Michigan
Michigan populated places on Lake Michigan
Populated places established in 1847
1847 establishments in Michigan